Malenice is a municipality and village in Strakonice District in the South Bohemian Region of the Czech Republic. It has about 700 inhabitants.

Administrative parts
Villages of Straňovice and Zlešice are administrative parts of Malenice.

References

Villages in Strakonice District